The Cover Girls are an all-female, New York city-based freestyle music group that achieved most of its chart success in the late 1980s and early 1990s. Among the group's best-known songs are "Show Me", "Because of You", "Don't Stop Now" and "Wishing on a Star".

History
The Cover Girls were formed by music producer and songwriter Andy "Panda" Tripoli and music promoter and dance club owner Sal Abbatiello and was originally composed of singers Angel Mercado, Caroline Jackson and Sunshine Wright. The group released their first album, Show Me, in late 1986. Five singles were released from this album, including the Top 40 Billboard Hot 100 hits "Because of You" and "Promise Me". The title track of the album was released as a 12-inch single prior to the album's release and was a Top 5 hit on the US dance chart. Sunshine Wright left after the release of the album and its second single "Spring Love", in late 1987, and was quickly replaced by Margo Urban, with whom the group released three more singles off the album. In 1988, the group recorded the song "Better Late Than Never" for the Coming to America film soundtrack, and it was released as a single.

The group's second album, We Can't Go Wrong, was released in 1989 and included the song "My Heart Skips a Beat" (Pop Top 40, Dance Top 5) as well as the title track, which was the group's first Top 10 pop hit in early 1990, peaking at number 8. The Cover Girls performed "My Heart Skips a Beat" and "We Can't Go Wrong" on the series finale of American Bandstand in October 1989. "All That Glitters Isn't Gold" was the third single released from the We Can't Go Wrong album. Shortly after its release Angel Mercado left the group to pursue a solo career, and was replaced on lead vocals by Evelyn Escalera.

The first song recorded with this line-up was "Don't Stop Now", released for the compilation album Music Speaks Louder Than Words, which was a joint collaboration between American and Soviet songwriters. The song's music is a cover of Russian artist Viktor Reznikov's 1988 song "Domovoy", with new English lyrics written by Todd Cerney and Harold Payne. The song  was released as a single in 1990 with "Funk Boutique" originally as the B-Side. "Don't Stop Now" is credited for getting the Cover Girls signed to Epic Records. In 1990, the Cover Girls recorded the song "New York City Christmas" with Escalera on lead vocals. The song has appeared on several Christmas compilations. In 1990 "Funk Boutique" began to be played at radio and in 1991 a single including remixes of the song was then released with "Don't Stop Now" as the B-Side. After the release of this single, Margo Urban left the group and was replaced by Michelle Valentine.

The group's third studio album, Here It Is, released in 1992, features for the first time two lead singers, Escalera and Valentine, and produced the group's most recent hit, a cover version of the Rose Royce 1978 song "Wishing on a Star". The Cover Girls' version of this song became its second Top 10 pop hit when it peaked at number 9 in the summer of 1992. The song also reached the Top 40 of the UK Singles Chart that same year. Followed by the single "Thank You", with Valentine and Escalera sharing lead vocals. A Spanish Version of the song "Wishing On A Star" was recorded as the B-Side to "Thank You", with Escalera and Valentine both contributing lead vocals on this version. Shortly after the release of "Thank You", Jackson left the group. Escalera & Valentine continued performing as a duo. "If You Want My Love (here it is)" was the final single from the album "Here It Is". The Spanish Version of "Wishing On A Star" titled "Estrella Del Amor" was also issue as a promotional single by Sony Discos.

In 1993, Evelyn Escalera recorded vocals on a promotional single entitled "Can You Feel It?" by Fish released on Cupid Records.

In 1994, the group contributed the new song "You Better Change" to the soundtrack of the film I Like It Like That.

The group returned in 1996 with the album "Satisfy". Both singles off the album had different versions and different lead vocals for each song. The first single "I Am Woman" was released originally with Valentine on lead vocals. But shortly after the single was released Valentine left the group. Lead vocals were then taken over by Gayle Ellis. On "I Need Your Lovin'" the album vocals were by Valentine and the single remix vocals were handled by Ellis and Escalera (who had then returned to the group from hiatis). Nicki Richards also recorded her lead vocals on some of the "Satisy" album tracks; notably "Whenever You Need Me" and "Keep On Giving Me Love".

In 1997, Sabrina Nieves contributed the track "Supersonic" under the name Sabrina Sang on the Jock Jams Vol. 3 album.

In 1998, Lorraine Munoz released the single "Ritmo De La Noche" under the name Lorena Martinez from the Latin Mix USA album.

Former member Angel Mercado released her solo debut album, Angel, in 2000. The album contained a new version of the Cover Girls song "Show Me" produced by Tony Moran.

In 2002 a remake of Sweet Sensation's "Hooked On You" was recorded by Escalera for the album Freestyle Party. Promotional remixes of the song, also featuring Escalera where released by Fever Records. Evelyn Escalera can also be heard singing the background vocals on the re-recorded instrumental version of "Show Me" from the Freestyle Mix USA Vol. 1 album. The song is featured at the end of the Cover Girls song "Because of You" ("Show Me" is not listed as a song on the track listing but is remixed in with the instrumental version of "Because of You").

Angel Mercado began touring extensively as Angel OCG (Original CoverGirl) under the bookings of La' Entertainment, landing dates with major Freestyle concerts throughout the country and abroad.

In 2004 Angel Mercado, along with Lil' Suzy and Lisette Melendez, joined a concept created by latif Mercado called S.A.L. a live compilation of some of Freestyle's biggest songs, the success of this group made S.A.L. one of the most sort of Freestyle acts in the market, which ran until 2014.

A planned dance single for the song "I'll Stand By You" featuring Escalera, Lorraine Munoz and Sabrina Nieves was never released.

In 2006, The Cover Girls (Escalera, Munoz and Nieves) contributed vocals on the Cobra Starship song "The Ballad of Big Poppa and Diamond Girl" from the Cobra Starship album While the City Sleeps, We Rule the Streets.

In November 2008, Evelyn Escalera released her first solo single, a cover of the Mariah Carey Christmas classic "All I Want for Christmas is You", available on iTunes, under her new pseudonym Evelyn DeMille.

In 2010, Evelyn Escalera contributed the track "Grown Up Christmas List" to the "A Traditional Freestyle Christmas Vol 1" Album.

In 2011, the "Original" Cover Girls, Angel Mercado, Caroline Jackson, and Margo Urban, reunited under the new management of Latif Mercado, husband of lead singer Angel.

The group's debut performance was for Long Beach Pride to nearly 40,000 attendees. The event was such a success that the group continued to perform as The "Original" Cover Girls, so as not to be confused by the others.

On July 5, 2014, Original Cover Girl, Sunshine rejoined the group and has been performing with them ever since.

Michelle Valentine went on to become an author, writer, and novelist. Writing Nyagra's Falls, A Girl's Gotta Eat, and The Year it Snowed in April.

On November 7, 2015, the Cover Girls (Escalera, Munoz and Nieves) were featured in a documentary on freestyle music titled Legends of Freestyle. Interviewing all top freestyle artists and delving into the history and movement of this genre. The Documentary presented by Stanulis Productions premiered at the HBO Urban Action Film Festival at the AMC Theater; one night only on Sat Nov 7th 2015 on 47th Street in New York City. Legends of Freestyle is available to download at Amazon.com with a run time of 1 hour, 36 minutes.

In 2022, original member Caroline Jackson retired from the group and was replaced by former member Michelle Valentine. Angel, Michelle and Margo are now touring as The "Original" Cover Girls.

Members

Discography

Studio albums

Compilation albums

Singles

References

External links
Fever Records

Latif Mercado / La' Entertainment

Musical groups from New York City
Musical groups established in 1986
American dance girl groups
American dance music groups
American freestyle music groups
Capitol Records artists
Epic Records artists
1986 establishments in New York City
Women in New York City